The Men's Javelin Throw event at the 1984 Summer Olympics in Los Angeles, California, had an entry list of 28 competitors. The final was held on August 5, 1984, and the qualifying round on August 4, 1984, with the qualification mark set at 83.00 metres.

Medalists

Schedule
All times are Pacific Standard Time (UTC-8)

Abbreviations
All results shown are in metres

Records

Qualification

Group A

Group B

Final

See also
 1982 Men's European Championships Javelin Throw (Athens)
 1983 Men's World Championships Javelin Throw (Helsinki)
 1984 Men's Friendship Games Javelin Throw (Moscow)
 1984 Javelin Throw Year Ranking
 1986 Men's European Championships Javelin Throw (Stuttgart)
 1987 Men's World Championships Javelin Throw (Rome)

References

External links
  Official Report
  Results
  todor66
  olympic.neostrada
  koti.welho

J
Javelin throw at the Olympics
Men's events at the 1984 Summer Olympics